The Hub was a discussion forum on Tor hidden services on the dark web focused on darknet market reviews, cryptocurrency and security.

Second in popularity only to reddit's /r/DarkNetMarkets, the site was launched in January 2014 as a more secure, verifiable and discreetly moderated alternative. Vendors must be verified prior to getting a vendor status on the forum. The Hub has hosted Dr. Fernando Caudevilla, 'DoctorX' as an adviser for the site's drug users who has answered more than a thousand questions in the forums of the original Silk Road and Silk Road 2.0 and the site has an ongoing harm reduction and drug awareness program.

In March 2015 the administrator halted all withdrawals from the platform and vanished with $50M.

References

External links 
 

Darknet markets
Internet properties established in 2014
Tor onion services
Internet forums